Robert Käslin (14 November 1871 in Aarau, Switzerland – 3 July 1934) was a jurist and Swiss politician for the Free Democratic Party of Switzerland. 

The son of the conductor, choirmaster, and composer Eusebius Käslin and brother of the writer Hans Käslin, he graduated from the district school in Aarau in 1892. He then studied law at the Universities of Bern, Munich, and Heidelberg. After receiving his doctorate, he passed his bar exam of the canton of Aargau and was a law clerk at the District Court of Baden in 1900, as well as an editor of the Aargauer Tagblatt.

In 1902, Käslin joined the federal administration and was until 1911 adjunct in the Department of Justice and Police. From 1912 to 1914, he served as secretary of the second Expert Committee on the Criminal Code. In 1914 he joined the Department of Justice and Police, which he headed from 1918. In 1919 he was elected Federal Vice-Chancellor.

After the unexpected death of Chancellor Adolf von Steiger, Käslin was elected by the Federal Assembly unopposed. Since the Catholic Conservative People's Party had a second Federal Council seat since 1919, they renounced this in a counter-bid. In the area of public affairs Käslin is considered a pioneer of public relations, as he organized the first head of the Federal Chancellery regular meeting with the press. In March 1934, he was forced to resign for health reasons. Three months later he died of heart disease.

References

Federal Chancellors of Switzerland
1871 births
1934 deaths
20th-century Swiss politicians
People from Aarau